Kunjo Chaya  is an  Indian Bengali television soap opera that premiered on 26 August 2019, and was broadcast on Bengali General Entertainment Channel Star Jalsha and is also available on the digital platform Hotstar The show stars Pallavi Dey  and Somraj Maity in lead roles with Shankar Chakraborty in a pivotal role. It marks the return of Somraj Maity into Bengali television. The show is produced by Tent Family Dassani Team.

Premise
The show revolves around Subhash Sanyal and Shalik. Subhash Sanyal is a revered person in the village. He is aged, but stout. He is known as Masterdadu. Masterdadu's right hand is Shalik. Subhash aka Masterdadu never compromises with wrongdoings on the part of others. But that's his public image.

Cast

Main
Pallavi Dey as Shalik
Somraj Maity as Ishaan-Subhash's grandson. Subhash shares a beautiful bond with his grandson
Shankar Chakraborty as Subash Sanyal (Dadu)- Subhash Sanyal, a retired teacher, who spent his life in a village. He is a man of principles.

Supporting
Subrata Guha Roy as Ishan's elder paternal uncle, Mala's husband
Animesh Bhaduri as Tarun- Sejhuti and Ishan's father
Joyti Chakraborty as Sejhuti and Ishan's mother
Kinni Modak as Sejhuti
Manosi Sengupta as Papri
Tanuka Chatterjee as Mala
Rajib Bose- Mala elder son, Papri's wife
Chandranibha Mukherjee- Mala's younger son

References

External links

Bengali-language television programming in India
2019 Indian television series debuts
2020 Indian television series endings
Indian drama television series
Star Jalsha original programming